Justice Barker may refer to:

James Barker (judge) (1839–1905), associate justice of the Massachusetts Supreme Judicial Court
Michael Barker (judge) (fl. 1970s–2010s), judge of the Supreme Court of Western Australia
William M. Barker (born 1941), chief justice of the Tennessee Supreme Court

See also
Judge Barker (disambiguation)